The Jensen Prize is an annual prize given to authors with the best corporate finance and organizations research papers published in the Journal of Financial Economics.  The award is named after Michael Jensen, a co-founding advisory editor of the journal.

Details
Each year personal and student subscribers to the Journal of Financial Economics vote for the best paper in each of two categories after the journal's editorial office has enumerated all articles and assigned them to either the corporate finance and organizations area or the capital markets and asset pricing areas.  Each subscriber may use one vote for each category.  Currently the first prize in each category is $5,000 and the second prize is $2,500.  The 2007 voting occurred from February 1 - May 31, 2007.

Winners
The following table is a complete list of past winners of the Jensen Prize:

See also

 List of economics awards

Notes

Economics awards